Abhijeet Singh Sanga (born 2 August 1983) is an Indian politician and a member of Uttar Pradesh Legislative Assembly. He represents the Bithoor assembly constituency of Kanpur Nagar district.

Political career
Abhijeet Singh Sanga started his political career from Samajwadi Party then moved to Indian National Congress and contested 2012 U.P. Assembly election from AC Bithoor on Congress symbol. Until early 2017 he was Kanpur Gramin Congress President, then he joined BJP and contested Uttar Pradesh Assembly Election as Bharatiya Janata Party candidate and defeated his close contestant Munindra Shukla from Samajwadi Party with a margin of 58,987 votes. Again he became MLA by beating the same opponent in 2022.

Posts held

References

People from Kanpur
Bharatiya Janata Party politicians from Uttar Pradesh
Uttar Pradesh MLAs 2017–2022
Living people
1983 births
Uttar Pradesh MLAs 2022–2027